9-Borabicyclo[3.3.1]nonane or 9-BBN is an organoborane compound. This colourless solid is used in organic chemistry as a hydroboration reagent. The compound exists as a hydride-bridged dimer, which easily cleaves in the presence of reducible substrates. 9-BBN is also known by its nickname 'banana borane'. This is because rather than drawing out the full structure, chemists often simply draw a banana shape with the bridging boron.

Preparation
9-BBN is prepared by the reaction of 1,5-cyclooctadiene and borane usually in ethereal solvents, for example:

The compound is commercially available as a solution in tetrahydrofuran and as a solid. 9-BBN is especially useful in Suzuki reactions.

Its highly regioselective addition on alkenes allows the preparation of terminal alcohols by subsequent oxidative cleavage with H2O2 in aqueous KOH. The steric demand of 9-BBN greatly suppresses the formation of the 2-substituted isomer compared to the use of borane.

See also
 Organoboron chemistry
 Boron

References

Organoboranes
Reagents for organic chemistry